Abner Taylor (January 19, 1829 – April 13, 1903) was a U.S. Representative from Illinois.

Born in Bangor, Maine, Taylor moved with his parents to Champaign County, Ohio, in 1832, thence to Fort Dodge, Iowa, and subsequently to Chicago, Illinois, in 1860. He served the Union the American Civil War as a general's deputy, and later a colonel and United States Treasury Agent. As a business man, Taylor engaged in extensive contracting, building, and mercantile pursuits, and participated in the construction of the Texas State Capitol. In exchange for the construction of the Texas State House, Taylor was awarded three million acres of land in northwest Texas in 1882. He served as a delegate to the 1884 Republican National Convention. Further, Taylor served as a member of the Illinois House of Representatives from 1884 to 1886.

Taylor was elected as a Republican to the Fifty-first and Fifty-second Congresses (March 4, 1889 – March 3, 1893). He married Clara Babcock, a daughter of business associate Colonel A C Babcock on September 9, 1889, in Cassopolis, Michigan. Clara was nearly thirty-two years his junior. The millionaire and his lively bride were well known in Congress. Clara made international news when she announced that rather than keeping Congressmen's signatures in an autograph book, she would have them embroidered onto a petticoat in silk to keep as a record of the 52nd Congress.

Taylor did not campaign in 1892, he instead resumed the building and contracting business. He died in Washington, D.C., in 1903, and was interred in Rock Creek Cemetery.

See also
XIT Ranch

References

 
 
 "Michigan, Marriages, 1868-1925," index and images, FamilySearch (https://familysearch.org/pal:/MM9.1.1/NQ7T-VT2 : accessed 30 Sep 2012), Abner Taylor and Clara L. Babcock, 09 Sep 1889.
 

1829 births
1903 deaths
Republican Party members of the Illinois House of Representatives
Politicians from Chicago
American construction businesspeople
Politicians from Bangor, Maine
Burials at Rock Creek Cemetery
Politicians from Fort Dodge, Iowa
Republican Party members of the United States House of Representatives from Illinois
19th-century American politicians
People of Illinois in the American Civil War
19th-century American businesspeople